Ann Phoenix,  (born 27 March 1955) is a British psychologist and academic, whose research focuses on psychosocial issues related to identity. She is Professor of Psychosocial Studies at the Institute of Education, University College London. She was previously ESRC Professorial Fellow for the Transforming Experiences research programme. She was previously Co-Director of the Thomas Coram Research Unit, and Reader in Psychology at the Open University.

Academic career
Phoenix's early academic career was spent at the Open University. She was a senior lecturer and then Reader in psychology. She was a visiting professor at the University of Humanistic Studies in Utrecht, The Netherlands, for the 1997–1998 academic year. In 2003, she was promoted to Professor of Social Science and Developmental Psychology. In 2007, she joined the Institute of Education, then part of the University of London, as Professor of Education, and Co-Director, Thomas Coram Research Unit. In 2014, the Institute of Education became part of University College London (UCL).

Honours
In 2014, Phoenix was elected a Fellow of the British Academy, the United Kingdom's national academy for the humanities and social sciences. She is also a Fellow of the Academy of Social Sciences (FAcSS).

Publications

Books 
 
 
 
 
 
 
  Pdf.

Journal articles

Conference papers 
  Pdf.

References

External links 
 An interview with Ann Phoenix, on the Institute of Education YouTube Channel. Published 17 January 2013; accessed 2 June 2015.

1955 births
Academics of the UCL Institute of Education
Academics of the Open University
British psychologists
British educational theorists
Fellows of the British Academy
Living people
Place of birth missing (living people)
British women academics
Fellows of the Academy of Social Sciences